Hydrophis melanocephalus, commonly known as the slender-necked sea snake, is a species of venomous sea snake in the family Elapidae.

Geographic range
South China Sea, Jeju Island, Korea.
Japan (Ryūkyū, Hokkaidō, Kochi).
Coasts of Taiwan and Guangdong northward to Zhejiang (China).
Australia (North Territory?, Western Australia), New Guinea.

Description
Head black dorsally and ventrally, with a yellowish bar on the prefrontals, and with a yellowish streak behind the eye on the postocular and upper portion of last upper labial. Anterior part of body black dorsally and ventrally, with yellow crossbars on the dorsum. Posterior part of body olive dorsally and yellow ventrally, with black rings, which are broader on the dorsum.

All dorsal scales rhomboidal and imbricate (overlapping). Dorsal scales on neck smooth, arranged in 25 rows. Dorsal scales on body with a short keel or small tubercle, in 35 rows. Ventrals 329.

The head very small and the body long, very slender anteriorly. Rostral slightly broader than deep. Frontal nearly twice as long as broad, as long as its distance from the rostral, slightly shorter than the parietals. One preocular and one postocular. A single anterior temporal. Seven or eight upper labials, second largest and in contact with the prefrontal, third and fourth (or third, fourth, and fifth) entering the eye. The are two pairs of small chin shields, in contact with each other. The tail is laterally flattened and oar-like.

References

Further reading
 Gray, J.E. 1849. Catalogue of the Specimens of Snakes in the Collection of the British Museum. Trustees of the British Museum. London. xv + 125 pp. (Hydrophis sublævis Var. melanocephala, p. 53.)
 Kharin, V.E. 1984. A review of sea snakes of the group Hydrophis sensu lato (Serpentes, Hydrophiidae). 3. The genus Leioselasma [in Russian]. Zoologicheskii Zhurnal 63 (10): 1535–1546.

melanocephalus
Reptiles of Asia
Reptiles of China
Reptiles of Korea
Reptiles of Western Australia
Reptiles of Japan
Taxa named by John Edward Gray
Reptiles described in 1849
Snakes of Australia
Snakes of New Guinea